Corbin High School (CHS) is a senior high school in Corbin, Kentucky, United States. A part of the Corbin Independent School District, it serves grades 9–12. In 2016, it had about 950 students.
Corbin football championship 1976,77,80,82 
Tom GREER HEAD COACH
BIO CORBIN HIGH 1982 RB DB 
WKU DB 83/85
Union ky 86
Asst COACH 1987 UNION

CORBIN COACH 2022

Athletics
Corbin High had a number of notable athletes who were active in the 1950s and 1960s and became a part of professional and university athletic teams, including:
 Tommy Adkins
 Bob Barton
 Billy Bird - American football player
 Calvin Bird - American football player; a member of the 1955 team, which never had a loss
 Jerry Bird - basketball player
 Rodger Bird - American football player
 Steve Bird
 Bob Coleman
 Jesse Grant
 Roy Kidd
 Frank Selvy - basketball player
 Jerry Smith

Gary West, a man from Bowling Green, Kentucky, who became friends with Rodger Bird while attending university, stated that the community little leagues formed the foundation for the success of athletics at Corbin High; all of the players of the little leagues attended the same high school.

In 2013, West wrote a book, The Boys from Corbin, America's Greatest Little Sports Town, discussing the school's sports teams of the 1950s and 1960s. At first, Rodger Bird declined to assist with the writing a book about his high school career, but six months later he agreed on the condition that the book also discussed the Selvys and other famous athletes from CHS.

References

Further reading
 West, Gary P. The Boys from Corbin: America's Greatest Little Sports Town. Acclaim Press, 2013. , 9781938905230. Profile at Google Books.

External links
 Corbin High School

Corbin, Kentucky
Public high schools in Kentucky
Buildings and structures in Whitley County, Kentucky
Education in Whitley County, Kentucky
Education in Knox County, Kentucky